The Corâta is a right tributary of the river Mostiștea in Romania. It flows into the Mostiștea near Codreni.

References

Rivers of Romania
Rivers of Călărași County